Miklós Toldi (c. 1320 – November 22, 1390) was a Hungarian nobleman from Bihar County of the Kingdom of Hungary, who is remembered as a legendary strong hero in Hungarian folklore. Hungarian poet János Arany based his famous Toldi trilogy on his legend.

Life
Toldi was long regarded as fictional, with scant historical evidence of his life. However, it has been shown from charters that Miklós Toldi and György Toldi were real persons under kings Charles Robert and Louis the Great. He is mentioned in 1354 as the alispán and várnagy  of Pozsony County, in 1383 and 1385 as the főispán (English: count) of Szabolcs County. He took part in the campaigns of Louis the Great in Italy as a mercenary leader. In 1359, on request of the king, he brought two lion cubs from Firenze. He had to flee his home because he killed a soldier of his brother, György.

Legacy
The earliest and most detailed source about Toldi is Péter Ilosvai Selymes's Az híres nevezetes Toldi Miklósnak jeles cselekedeteiről és bajnokosodásáról való história (Story of the great deeds and braveries of the fabulous Miklós Toldi, Debrecen, 1574).

In folklore, Toldi has been remembered the longest in Nógrád and Bihar County and they emphasize his physical strength but place him a century later in the age of King Matthias Corvinus.

The most famous work is the Toldi trilogy by János Arany. According to tradition, the Stump Tower (Csonka-torony) near Arany's home town of Nagyszalonta had been owned by the Toldi family. Arany's trilogy was adapted into an animated film in the 1980s under the title Heroic Times.

The Toldi, a Hungarian light tank developed and used during World War II, was named after him.

References

External links

14th-century Hungarian people
1320s births
1390 deaths
Hungarian nobility
Hungarian folklore
Hungarian soldiers
Medieval legends